Rampal may refer to:

People
 Rampal (Spritual Leader) (born 1951), an Indian religious leader
 Raja Rampal Singh (1849–1909), ruler of Kalakankar estate of Oudh in British India
 Joseph Rampal (1898–1983), French flautist
 Jean-Pierre Rampal (1922–2000), French flautist and son of Joseph Rampal
 Rampal Singh (Uttar Pradesh politician) (born 1930), Indian politician from Uttar Pradesh
 Rampal Singh (Madhya Pradesh politician) (born 1956), Indian politician from Madhya Pradesh
 Arjun Rampal (born 1972), Indian model and actor
 Rampal Meghwal, Indian politician

Places
 Rampal Upazila, an upazila (sub-district) of Bagerhat District, Bangladesh
 Rampal Power Station (Proposed), a proposed 1320 megawatt coal-fired power station in Rampal Upazila